Rao Muhammad Ajmal Khan (born 20 August 1954) is a Pakistani politician who has been a member of the National Assembly of Pakistan, since August 2018. Previously he was a member of the National Assembly from 2002 to 2007 and again from June 2013 to May 2018.

Early life
He was born on 20 August 1954.

Political career

He was elected to the National Assembly of Pakistan as an independent candidate from Constituency NA-146 (Okara-IV) in 2002 Pakistani general election. He received 62,711 votes and defeated Rao Muhammad Safdar Khan, a candidate of Pakistan Muslim League (Q) (PML-Q). In August 2003, he was appointed as Federal Parliamentary Secretary for petroleum and natural resources.

He ran for the seat of the National Assembly as a candidate of PML-Q from Constituency NA-146 (Okara-IV) in 2008 Pakistani general election, but was unsuccessful. He received 46,006 votes and lost the seat to Manzoor Wattoo. In the same election, he ran for the seat of the Provincial Assembly of the Punjab as an independent candidate from Constituency PP-192 (Okara-VIII) but was unsuccessful. He received 65 votes and lost the seat to Malik Ali Abbas Khokhar.

He was re-elected to the National Assembly as a candidate of Pakistan Muslim League (N) (PML-N) from Constituency NA-146 (Okara-IV) in 2013 Pakistani general election. He received 109,998 votes and defeated Manzoor Wattoo. During his tenure as Member of the National Assembly, he served as Federal Parliamentary Secretary for Industries and Production.

He was re-elected to the National Assembly as a candidate of PML-N from Constituency NA-143 (Okara-III) in 2018 Pakistani general election.

References

Living people
Pakistan Muslim League (N) politicians
Punjabi people
Pakistani MNAs 2013–2018
1954 births
Pakistani MNAs 2002–2007
Pakistani MNAs 2018–2023